Amruta Khanvilkar (born 23 November 1984) is an Indian film and television actress. She primarily works in Marathi and Hindi films. Khanvilkar aspired to be a film actress from an early age and began her career as a contestant on India's Best Cinestars Ki Khoj in 2004. She made her Marathi film debut with Golmaal (2006) and her Hindi debut with Mumbai Salsa (2007). This was followed by commercial success with Saade Maade Teen (2007) and Phoonk (2008).

She gained popularity in 2010 with her Lavani dance performance "Wajale Ki Bara" from the Marathi film Natarang. Her performance in the highly praised Katyar Kaljat Ghusali in 2015 won her praise and nominations at the Maharashtra State Film Awards and Filmfare Awards-Marathi. Khanvilkar appeared in supporting roles in the high-profile Hindi films Raazi (2018), Satyameva Jayate (2018), and Malang (2020). Her other notable films are Shala (2011), Aayna Ka Bayna (2012), Welcome Zindagi (2015), Well Done Baby (2021), and Pondicherry (2022). Her title role in the 2022 romantic drama Chandramukhi was both critically and commercially successful.

In addition to her work in films, Khanvilkar has also been in reality shows such as Nach Baliye 7, where she won, and Fear Factor: Khatron Ke Khiladi 10, as well as anchoring Dance Maharashtra Dance – Season 1 (2012), Dance India Dance 6, and Famously Filmfare Marathi (2018). She also appeared in the cult single "Aye Hip Hopper" by Ishq Bector, which was released in 2009.

Early life 
Khanvilkar was born in 1984 in Mumbai to a Maharashtrian family. She studied in Karnataka High School in Pune and graduated from Marathwada Mitra Mandal College of Commerce in Pune.

Career
Khanvilkar began her career in 2004 as a contestant on one of the first reality shows on Indian television, Zee Cine Star ki Khoj, and the same year she co-starred in the Hindi short film Saanjh, presented by the Film and Television Institute of India, opposite Amitabh Bhattacharjee. This led to further appearances on the television shows Ada and Time Bomb 9/11 in 2005, and she also emerged as the first runner-up in the Marathi reality show Eka Peksha Ek (2007).

Khanvilkar made her film debut in the Marathi comedy Golmaal (2006), where her performance was well received. In 2007, she made her Hindi film debut in Mumbai Salsa, portraying a nymphomaniac flatmate to Manjari Phadnis' character. Soon after, she appeared in Hattrick (2007), Saade Maade Teen (2007), and Gaiir (2009). In 2008, she collaborated with director Ram Gopal Verma on two films: Contract, a young and bubbly girl set against the backdrop of terrorism and infiltration, and Phoonk, a mature woman with a de-glamorized look based on superstition and black magic. Her work was praised, and the latter was declared a box office blockbuster. She later featured in the sequel, Phoonk 2 (2010).

She gained popularity in 2010 when she performed the song "Wajale Ki Bara" in Ravi Jadhav's film Natarang, which was sung by Bela Shende. In 2011, she portrayed Marathi teacher Paranajpe Bai in Sujay Dahake's Shala, based on Milind Bokil's novel of the same name. The film premiered at the New York Indian Film Festival and went on to win the Silver Lotus Award at the 59th National Film Awards. Following that, she appeared in Arjun as a supportive girlfriend opposite Sachit Patil and Zakaas as a typical village girl, both of which were financially successful. Her performance in the musical film Aayna ka Bayna (2012) earned her Best Actress at CineRockom International Film Festival.

In 2015, she acted as Shreyas Talpade's love interest in the superhero film Baji. Following that, she appeared in Welcome Zindagi, a dark comedy about life and death that was a Marathi remake of the Bengali film Hemlock Society. Later that year, she played Muslim girl Zareena, Khansaheb's daughter, in Subodh Bhave's feature film Katyar Kaljat Ghusali, which was based on the play of the same name. Khanvilkar's performance was acclaimed, and she earned her first nomination for a Filmfare Marathi Award for Best Supporting Actress. Katyar Kaljat Ghusali earned over ₹40 crores (US$6.24 million) and emerge as one of the highest-grossing Marathi films of all time. Other films in which she has appeared include the Hindi drama Baaki Itihaas (2017), the historical war drama Rangoon (2017), and the Marathi mystery One Way Ticket (2016).

Khanvilkar was recognized for her contributions to Hindi projects in 2018. In Meghna Gulzar's Raazi, she plays Alia Bhatt's Pakistani widowed sister-in-law Munira. Both reviewers and the public praised her performance. This also marked her first feature in a Hindi film in eight years. Her next role was as the vivacious and mischievous wife opposite Manoj Bajpayee in Satyameva Jayate, directed by Milap Zaveri.  In the same year, she made her digital debut as Lady Serial Killer Lavina Birdie with the first season of web series titled Damaged opposite Amit Sial for Hungama Play, playing an unusual and path-breaking character. She was first reluctant to perform a bold character in front of the camera. She read several mysterious books in preparation for her part.  For her portrayal of Lovina critics wrote, "Amruta probably took up a mighty challenge, but by the end of the show it is hard to imagine any other actor who could have played Lovina better." Another wrote, "She essays the role of the deviant Lovina so well that for one moment you can't distinguish between the actor and the character. Her role, albeit a difficult one, has her toggling through the entire gamut of emotions and she makes it seem like child's play. It's heartening to see stories like this being crafted and roles like these being taken up by such talented actors. She had a brief appearance in the Marathi biographical drama film Ani... Dr. Kashinath Ghanekar, where she enacted Sandhya Shantaram's role of Chandrakala from the Marathi film Pinjra (1972).

Khanvilkar took on the role of a troubled Catholic wife of Michael Rodrigues (played by Kunal Khemu) in Mohit Suri's action thriller Malang (2020), with several critics praising her performance with fewer words but a more expressive character. Her other release of the year was the Marathi comedy Choricha Mamla.

The following year, she acted in the Marathi drama Well Done Baby (2021), which depicts the narrative of a modern young couple attempting to identify the purpose of their relationship while simultaneously dealing with the arrival of a new member into their life. A Mashable critic stated, "She aces it as Meera. Her frustrations, her dilemma, her insecurities, and her urge to gain some kind of normalcy in her life are brought to the fore by Khanvilkar so immaculately." The film was released directly on Amazon Prime Video. Over the years, she has also been part of television shows like 24 (2016), Dance India Dance 6 (2017), Famously Filmfare Marathi (2018), and Fear Factor: Khatron Ke Khiladi 10 (2020).

In 2022, Khanvilkar got her first titular role, as a tragic Tamasha performer in Prasad Oak's Marathi musical love drama Chandramukhi, based on Vishwas Patil's renowned novel of the same name. She was Oak's first choice, but her part was kept fully secret until it was unveiled at the Royal Opera House by a 35-foot-tall cut-out dressed as Chandra. She went through eight months of training to improve her language and diction while also gaining over 15 kg to fit the role. The film and her performance were both anticipated and commercially successful. Shubham Kulkarni of koimoi.com ascribed her hard work and her expressive eyes and wrote, "[Khanvilkar] is an actor who can do amazing work if given a good director. With a film on her shoulders, she manages to have the depth in her eyes and pain in her demeanour. She is exploited, looked at with a bad gaze, and even tried to be sold." Sameer Ahire expressed his happiness for her performance-oriented role and remarked, "The first frame of her, and you can't take your eyes off the screen. How beautiful she looks, …" Mihir Bhanage of The Times of India wrote, "...it is a sincere and committed performance from Amruta." The view was echoed by the Cinestaan critic, Suyog Zore, saying "...the film belongs to Khanvilkar. The actress has simply poured herself into the character."

She next portrayed Manasi as a downtrodden girl who never had the authority over her life decisions in Sachin Kundalkar's Pondicherry which was the first Marathi and one of the first Indian feature films to be shot completely on a smartphone. The Times of India's Mihir Bhange described her as "a surprise package" and wrote that "her role is brief, but she does complete justice to it." Her next brief appearance was in the pan-Indian Marathi historical action film Har Har Mahadev alongside Sharad Kelkar. The film received positive reviews, with critics praising Khanvilkar for her impressive portrayal of Sonabai.

In July 2022, it was confirmed that she will be participating in Jhalak Dikhhla Jaa 10 pairing up with choreographer Pratik Utekar,  where she ended up finishing in 9th place.

Upcoming projects

Khanvilkar will next reunite with Ankush Chaudhari for Satish Rajwade's romantic film Autograph – Ek Japun Thevavi Ashi Lovestory. She is playing the lead in Disney+ Hotstar's next by Hansal Mehta titled Lootere opposite Rajat Kapoor. On the occasion of Republic Day, she announced a sports biopic on Lalita Shivaji Babar, an Indian long-distance runner from Satara district.

Personal life 
She met co-participant Himmanshoo A. Malhotra on the sets of India's Best Cinestars Ki Khoj and they fell in love. After a decade of dating, the couple married on 24 January 2015, in Delhi. In 2015, they both won the dancing reality show Nach Baliye 7.

Filmography

Films

Television

Web series

Music videos

Accolades

References

External links
 
 
 

Living people
Indian film actresses
Actresses from Pune
21st-century Indian actresses
Actresses in Marathi cinema
Actresses in Hindi cinema
1984 births
Fear Factor: Khatron Ke Khiladi participants